Kalpana Kotagal is an American employment attorney who is the nominee to serve as a commissioner of the Equal Employment Opportunity Commission.

Education 
Kotagal earned a dual Bachelor of Science and Bachelor of Arts degree from Stanford University and a Juris Doctor from the University of Pennsylvania Law School in 2005.

Career 
Kotagal served as a law clerk for Judge Betty Binns Fletcher. She later joined Cohen Milstein, where she has since worked as a partner. Kotagal was also a Wasserstein Public Interest Fellow at Harvard Law School. She specializes in employment law, Title VII, the Equal Pay Act of 1963, and diversity, equity, and inclusion. Kotagal is also known for co-creating the concept of the inclusion rider, a legal stipulation that has become popular to include in entertainment industry contracts.

Kotagal has represented workers in civil rights and employment class actions, including litigation against Sterling Jewelers alleging gender bias in pay and promotions and litigation against AT&T Mobility alleging pregnancy discrimination. She also represented female Walmart employees in Dukes v. Wal-Mart, and has continued to represent workers in individual cases against Walmart.

In 2021, Kotagal and the Transgender Legal Defense and Education Fund concluded negotiations with Aetna that ensured access to breast augmentation surgery for transfeminine policyholders.

Kotagal frequently writes and speaks on diversity, equity, and inclusion topics for general audiences. Her articles have appeared in outlets including The Washington Post, The Hill, and Refinery29. She appeared in the 2018 documentary film This Changes Everything.

Kotagal serves on the Advisory Board of University of Pennsylvania Law School's Office of Equity & Inclusion, as well as the Board of Directors of public interest legal organizations A Better Balance and Public Justice.

Personal life 
Kotagal lives in Cincinnati with her husband, Wyatt King, and two sons.

References 

Living people
People from Cincinnati
Lawyers from Cincinnati
Ohio lawyers
Stanford University alumni
University of Pennsylvania Law School alumni
American lawyers
Year of birth missing (living people)